The International Organ Festival (IOF) is a biennial music festival and organ competition held in St Albans, England since 1963.  Originally held annually, it was changed to every two years in 1965 due to the complexity of organising the increasingly ambitious programme.  The festival is run mainly by volunteers.

Background
The festival was conceived by Peter Hurford to celebrate the building of the new organ in St Albans Cathedral by Harrison & Harrison. The main competitions are still conducted on this instrument, its eclectic style and modern electropneumatic action now complemented by another self-contained tracker action instrument which The International Organ Festival Society, the charity which runs the Festival, has had built for its own use and sited at St Saviour's Church, St Albans.  This was built by Peter Collins in the style of, and in homage to, the early 18th century German organ builder Andreas Silbermann. There is a new (2005) organ in St Peter's Church, St Albans by Mander Organs, which has played a role in the festival and competitions since 2007. Recent competitions have also visited London, with competition rounds regularly held at Christ Church Spitalfields and, in 2017, a concerto final at St John's Smith Square.

There are two main competitions, the interpretation competition and the improvisation competition (formerly known as the Tournemire Prize).  Judges have included Piet Kee, Marie-Claire Alain, Anton Heiller, Ralph Downes, Harry Croft-Jackson, Thomas Trotter, Ton Koopman, Naji Hakim, Daniel Roth and David Sanger.  The competition is considered prestigious, as may be judged by the list of past winners (starting with Susan Landale in 1963 and Gillian Weir in 1964), and judges have occasionally decided not to award first prize.

The Artistic Director and Executive Director since 2007 is David Titterington, professor of organ at the Royal Academy of Music.

The 2023 festival and competitions, marking the festival's 60th anniversary, will take place from 3 to 15 July.

The Festival

The festival's associated concert series includes large orchestral and choral works, chamber music and solo performances, as well as evening jazz. The Three Choirs concert is an audience favourite, in which over the years the choristers of St Albans Cathedral have been joined by many of England's most celebrated cathedral choirs (for instance, in 2013 Salisbury Cathedral & York Minster, in 2015 Christ Church Cathedral, Oxford and Westminster Cathedral, and in 2017 St Paul's Cathedral & Temple Church).

Many of the great orchestras (the Royal Philharmonic Orchestra, the Royal Liverpool Philharmonic Orchestra and others) have played in the Festival, and there have been recitals and concerts from performers such as John Williams, Sarah Walker, Musica Antiqua Köln, Evelyn Glennie, Emma Kirkby, James Bowman and Julian Perkins.  Concerts have sometimes been broadcast on BBC Radio 3. Many concerts take place in the Cathedral, but the Festival takes place all over St Albans with other regular venues including St Peter's Church and St Saviour's Church. 

The 2021 Festival was one of the first events to take place after Covid-19 restrictions were partially relaxed in the UK. Performers included Nicola Benedetti with Aurora Orchestra, Tenebrae, Jess Gillam, Steven Osborne and Roderick Williams.

The Fringe

The IOF Fringe presents community-focused performances in a wide range of formal and unconventional venues.

Events were mostly outdoors in historic parts of the City such as in front of the Clock Tower and in the Tudor streets of St Michael's or in the Alban Arena. Artists taking part included Seth Lakeman, The Swanvesta Social Club and Isla St Clair.

Previously, cabaret events and other entertainment had been run as part of the festival, including performances from Richard Stilgoe, Jake Thackray, Instant Sunshine and others.

Past winners
The following individuals have won prizes at the festival.

Interpretation competition 
1963	Susan Landale, UK
1964	Gillian Weir, UK
1965	Hans Joachim Bartsch, Germany
1967	Danièle Gullo, France
1969	David Sanger, UK
1971	Larry Cortner, USA
1973	Jan Overduin, The Netherlands / Walter Glyn Jenkins, UK
1975	Lynne Davis, USA
1977	Peggy Haas, USA / Marcus Huxley, UK (joint second)
1979	Thomas Trotter, UK
1981	David Rowland, UK (second prize)
1983	Kevin Bowyer, UK
1985	Kimberly Marshall, USA
1985	Diane Meredith Belcher, USA  "(second prize)"
1987	Bas de Vroome, The Netherlands (second prize)
1989	Mikael Wahlin, Sweden
1991	Joseph Adam, USA
1993	Gabriel Marghieri, France
1995	Mattias Wager, Sweden
1997	David Goode, UK (second prize)
1999	Pier-Damiano Peretti, Italy
2001	Johannes Unger, Germany
2003	Herman Jordaan, South Africa
2005   Andrew Dewar, UK
2007   Ulrich Walther, Germany 
2009   Konstantin Volostnov, Russia
2011   David Baskeyfield, UK
2013   Simon Thomas Jacobs, UK
2015   Johannes Zeinler, Austria
2017   Thomas Gaynor, New Zealand
2019   Kumi Choi, South Korea
2021   Competition was held virtually due to Covid-19, with no first prize

Improvisation competition 
1963 	Guy Bovet, Switzerland
1964 	André Isoir, France
1971 	Hans Eugen Frischknecht, Switzerland
1973 	Kees van Ersel, The Netherlands
1975 	Nathan Ensign, USA
1977 	Jos van der Kooy, The Netherlands
1979 	Christoph Tietze, USA
1983 	Naji Hakim, France
1985 	Marie-Bernadette Dufourcet-Hakim, France
1987 	David Drury, Australia
1991 	Christoph Kuhlmann, Germany
1993 	David Briggs, UK
1997 	Martin Baker, UK
2001 	Hayo Boerema, The Netherlands / Thomas Lennartz, Germany (joint second)
2003 	Robert Houssart, The Netherlands
2005 	Gerben Mourik, The Netherlands
2007 	 not awarded 
2009 	Jean-Baptiste Dupont, France
2011 	Paul Goussot, France
2013 	Martin Sturm, Germany
2015   David Cassan, France
2017   not awarded
2019   Gabriele Agrimonti, Italy
2021   No improvisation competition was held

References

External links 
St Albans International Organ Festival website

Music festivals established in 1963
Classical music festivals in England
Pipe organ festivals
Music competitions in the United Kingdom
International Organ Festival
Music festivals in Hertfordshire